Ravenous Plague is a sixth studio album by Dutch extreme metal band Legion of the Damned. It was released on 3 January 2014 through Napalm Records.

Track listing

Personnel
Legion of the Damned
 Twan van Geel - guitars
 Harold Gielen - bass
 Maurice Swinkels - vocals
 Erik Fleuren - drums

Guest musicians
 Jo Blankenburg - Everything on "The Apocalyptic Surge"
 Hein Willekens - Solo guitar on "Morbid Death"

Production
 Wes Benscoter - cover art
 Stefan Heilemann photography
 Wouter Wagemans - artwork, design
 Andy Classen - production, mixing

References

2014 albums
Legion of the Damned (band) albums
Napalm Records albums
Albums produced by Andy Classen